Darius Sinathrya (born in Switzerland, May 21, 1985) is a Swiss-born Indonesian model, actor, TV performer, futsal manager and sport presenter. He is best known for his role in film Naga Bonar (Jadi) 2 and hosted programs such as Super Family Quiz and 2006 FIFA World Cup on SCTV.

Career 
Sinathrya has starred in soap operas such as Gatotkaca, Hantu Jatuh Cinta, and Bukan Salah Bunda Mengandung. His film career began with the film D'Bijis (2007). In the same year, Sinathrya also played in Naga Bonar (Jadi) 2 with Deddy Mizwar and Tora Sudiro. Several films which Darius later starred in included Pocong 3 (2007) and Love (2008).

In addition to his profession as an actor, he also served as manager of the Indonesia national futsal team as part of the team that won the 2010 AFF Futsal Championship title in Vietnam. However, the team failed to meet the target of qualifying for the 2010 AFC Futsal Championship in Uzbekistan.

Sinathrya was awarded as the most favorite television personality chosen by viewers in the sports event category at the 2007, 2009, 2010, and 2011 Panasonic Awards.

Personal life 
Sinathrya married Donna Agnesia on December 30, 2006, in a Catholic ceremony. Donna gave birth to their first child, Lionel Nathan Sinathrya Kartoprawiro, on June 28, 2007, six months after they were married. However, he firmly stated that the baby was old enough to be born. Agnesia gave birth to their second child, Diego Andres Sinathrya, on May 5, 2009. She gave birth to their third child, Queenesia Sabrina Sinathrya, on May 1, 2011.

Filmography

Soap operas
Bukan Salah Bunda Mengandung
Gatotkaca
Hantu Jatuh Cinta
Lukisan Jiwa
Si Cantik Dan Si Buruk Rupa eps Putri Tidur
M-Club

References

1985 births
21st-century Indonesian male actors
Indonesian male film actors
21st-century Indonesian male singers
Swiss emigrant to Indonesia
Indonesian people of Swiss descent
Indonesian Roman Catholics
Indonesian sports announcers
Indonesian television presenters
Living people
Indo people
Javanese people